The Karluk River is a stream,  long, on Kodiak Island in the U.S. state of Alaska. It begins at Karluk Lake in the Kodiak National Wildlife Refuge and flows north and then northwest through Karluk Lagoon to the Shelikof Strait at Karluk.

Sportfishing is popular in this river basin, "the largest and most productive" on Kodiak Island. It has significant runs of sockeye salmon, Coho, pink, Chinook, and chum salmon, and steelhead, and Dolly Varden trout are also prevalent. The entire main stem, rated Class I (easy) on the International Scale of River Difficulty, is floatable by raft or kayak.

See also
List of rivers of Alaska

References

Rivers of Kodiak Island Borough, Alaska
Rivers of Alaska